The Thames Valley Rugby Football Union (TVRFU) is the governing body of rugby union in the region of Thames Valley in the North Island of New Zealand. Their senior representative team compete in the Heartland Championship. Thames Valley Rugby Football Union was founded in 1921 when it broke away from the now defunct South Auckland Rugby Union. The Thames Rugby Union, a sub-union that had remained affiliated with the Auckland Rugby Football Union, eventually joined the Thames Valley Union in 1951.

The Thames Valley team plays at Boyd Park, Te Aroha and Paeroa Domain, Paeroa.

In 2018 Thames Valley won their first Heartland Championship by defeating South Canterbury 17-12 in the Meads Cup Final in Timaru (27 October 2018)

History 
Rugby has been played in the region since the 1870s and 1880s.

The Ohinemuri Union was founded at Waihi in 1896, and by 1904 this union was named the Goldfields Rugby Union. It consisted of a number of even smaller unions, but was itself a sub-union of the Auckland Rugby Football Union (ARFU), and was therefore not directly affiliated to the New Zealand Rugby Union (NZRU). Along with a number of other sub-unions, the Goldfields ceded from the ARFU to form the South Auckland Rugby Football Union in 1909.

Several sub-unions split away from the South Auckland Union between 1909 and 1921 to form new independent unions, and in 1921 the Hauraki Plains, Paeroa, Piako, Waihi sub-unions did the same to form the Thames Valley Rugby Football Union (TVRFU). The union was from then on directly affiliated to the NZRU. The Thames sub union, which had remained affiliated to the ARFU up until then, joined the TVRFU in 1951.

Championships
Thames Valley won the NPC 3rd division in 1988, 1990 and 1995, and in 2018 the Swampfoxes won their first Meads Cup

Heartland Championship placings

Ranfurly Shield
Thames Valley has never held the Ranfurly Shield. They have challenged for the shield unsuccessfully on 14 occasions; their most recent challenge was a 68–0 loss to Counties Manukau. The Swamp Foxes' following challenge was in June 2016, when they lost 83–13 to Waikato. In 2019 Thames Valley lost 41–21 against Otago in a solid display — at one point leading 13–0 in Wanaka.

Thames Valley in Super Rugby
Thames Valley along with Waikato, Counties Manukau, Bay of Plenty and King Country make up the Chiefs Super Rugby franchise. Albeit, they were initially part of the Blues.

All Blacks
Two Thames Valley players have been selected for the All Blacks:
 Kevin Barry 
 Bob O'Dea

Clubs
Thames Valley Rugby Football Union is made up of 12 clubs:
 COBRAS (Home of the Housefly)College Old Boys Rugby And Sports Senior A Senior B 
 Coromandel Senior A
 Hauraki North Senior A Senior B
 Mercury Bay Senior A Senior B
 Ngatea Senior B 
 Paeroa Rugby and Sports Club Senior A & B
 Tairua
 Thames Rugby and Sports Club Senior A Senior B
 Waihi Athletic Senior A Senior B 
 Waihou Senior A Senior B
 Whangamata Senior A

Thames Valley Results 
All Results - 1922/2017.

Results each year for Thames Valley

1922-49

1950-59

1960-69

1970-79

1980-89

1990-99

2000-09

2010–present

Result summaries per year...

Notes and references

External links
 Official Site

New Zealand rugby union teams
New Zealand rugby union governing bodies
Sport in Waikato
Sports organizations established in 1921